{{DISPLAYTITLE:N2-citryl-N6-acetyl-N6-hydroxylysine synthase}}

N2-citryl-N6-acetyl-N6-hydroxylysine synthase (N(alpha)-citryl-N(epsilon)-acetyl-N(epsilon)-hydroxylysine synthase, iucA (gene)) is an enzyme with systematic name citrate:N6-acetyl-N6-hydroxy-L-lysine ligase (ADP-forming). This enzyme catalyses the following chemical reaction

 2 ATP + citrate + N6-acetyl-N6-hydroxy-L-lysine + H2O  2 ADP + 2 phosphate + N2-citryl-N6-acetyl-N6-hydroxy-L-lysine

This enzyme requires Mg2+.

References

External links 
 

EC 6.3.2